The 1952 North Carolina Tar Heels football team represented the University of North Carolina at Chapel Hill during the 1952 college football season. The Tar Heels were led by tenth-year head coach Carl Snavely, and played their home games at Kenan Memorial Stadium. The team competed as a member of the Southern Conference for the last time, before North Carolina and six other schools broke off from the SoCon to form the Atlantic Coast Conference.

At the conclusion of the season, Snavely resigned as head coach after ten seasons. He posted a record of 59–35–5 while at UNC, retiring as the school's all-time winningest coach.

Schedule

References

North Carolina
North Carolina Tar Heels football seasons
North Carolina Tar Heels football